John Morelli (June 11, 1923 – January 26, 2004) was a professional American football player who played professionally for the Boston Yanks.  He played two seasons for the club, playing in 19 games in total.

References

External links
 Profile at Pro-Football Reference

1923 births
2004 deaths
Georgetown Hoyas football players
Boston Yanks players
People from Revere, Massachusetts